Melis Gülcan (born 28 May 1996) is a Turkish female basketball player. The  national plays Small forward.

Career
On 19 May 2021, she signed a one-year contract with Galatasaray.

References

External links
 Melis Gülcan at Tbf.org

1996 births
Living people
Galatasaray S.K. (women's basketball) players
Turkish women's basketball players
Small forwards
Fenerbahçe women's basketball players
Botaş SK players
20th-century Turkish sportswomen
21st-century Turkish sportswomen